Castelnuovo della Misericordia is a village in Tuscany, central Italy, administratively a frazione of the comune of Rosignano Marittimo, province of Livorno. At the time of the 2011 census its population was 843.

The village is about 24 km from Livorno and 5 km from Rosignano Marittimo.

Bibliography

External links 
 

Frazioni of the Province of Livorno